Vikrāntavarman I or Prakāśadharma (?–686 AD), was a king of Champa from the Gangaraja (Simhapura) dynasty, modern-day Central Vietnam, reigning from 653 to 686. His original name was Prakāśadharma but he took the appellation Vikrāntavarman when he was crowned in 653. He was the son of Prince Jagaddharma, the grandson of Kandarpadharma, and Princess Sarväpi, daughter of king Isanavarman I of Zhenla. He sent embassies to the court of Emperor Gaozong of Tang in 653, 654, 669, and 670, which he was known as Zhu Ghedi (諸葛地) and Bojiashebamo (鉢伽舍跋摩, Late Middle Chinese: pɑt-kaɨ/kɛ:-ɕia’/ɕiaʰ-bɑt-mɑ), as recorded in the New Book of Tang. He was known for expanding the Champa kingdom to the south, uniting the realm under one dynasty.

Expansion of Champa
Prakāśadharma conducted a series of military campaigns against other chiefdoms in the south. By 658 AD it is apparent that Champa's territory had already established to near modern-day Ninh Hòa city in Khánh Hòa. Notes that Champa's territorial extent was neither fixed or only one dynasty ruling entire the realm.

Administration
Prakāśadharma introduced and implemented the territorial division unit of viṣayas (district) for the first time. There were at least two known viṣayas: Caum and Midit.

It was highly likely that Prakāśadharma had spent some of his courtier and vacational times in the city of Viṣṇupura (at present day Cổ Thành, Quảng Trị, east of the Thạch Hãn River). Vaishnavism in Champa can only be found in Quang Tri.

Envoys to Tang Empire
The New Book of Tang recorded a king of Lam Ap named Zhu Ghede (Chinese: 諸葛地, pinyin: Zhū Gěde), while in the Tang Huiyao, Zhu Ghede's actual name was transcribed as Bojiashebamo (Chinese: 鉢伽舍跋摩; Late Middle Chinese: *pɑt-kaɨ/kɛ:-ɕia’/ɕiaʰ-bɑt-mɑ) reigning from 653 to 687, which is often attributed to the profile of Prakāśadharma. Prakāśadharma offered the Tang court an elephant on May 9, 653. He sent four more times envoys to the Tang court in May 654, February 657, August 669, and 670. 

Palaeographists however keep a skeptic that a straightforward identification of the data of medieval Chinese sources about the kingdom of Lam Ap/Linyi with epigraphic evidence of the Thu Bon River Valley is hardly plausible.

Constructing temples

During his reign Vikrantavarman built numerous temples at Mỹ Sơn, dedicating particularly to Śiva. Those temples he desired the worships of Kandarpadharma (the father of his grandfather's mother), for Śiva's friend Ekākṣapiṅgalā? Kuvera at Mỹ Sơn, dedicating for Amareśa; and a golden portrait of Śiva. 

He named for his beloved deity Kandarpapureśvara after his great-grandfather and king Kandarpadharma. Kandarpadharma was the father of Prakāśadharma's paternal grandmother. Jagaddharma was likely an alternative name for hitherto Bhadreśvaravarman (r. 650?-?). When Prabhasadharma's male descendants were put to death by a minister, Jagaddharma, one of his nephew who had escaped, traveling to the Khmer city Bhavapura (Sambor Prei Kuk) and then got married with Queen Śarvānī, daughter of Zhenla king Isanavarman, and gave birth to Prakāśadharma. 

Many pedestals, or kosas, were erected for his devotions to Śiva and Vishnu. Prakāśadharma's words proved himself a sophisticated, well-educated monarch in cosmopolitan Sanskrit learning and Indian philosophy.

Succession
Initially, scholars thought that there was a single Vikrantavarman ruled over Champa from 658 to 741, a impossible straight 83-years-reign. The existence of two kings named Vikrantavarman were figured out shortly after. Chinese documents reported that Prakāśadharma (Vikrantavarman I) had died in 686 and was succeeded by a son and namesake, Vikrantavarman II (r. ?-741, Jianduodamo). The second problem is as reported by Chinese annals, Prakāśadharma traditionally is believed to be succeeded by Vikrantavarman II. However, recent research shows indications that there is a king Naravāhanavarman ruled briefly between Prakāśadharma and Vikrantavarman II.

References

Bibliography
  
 
  

Kings of Champa